The Doradidae are a family of catfishes also known as thorny catfishes, raphael catfishes  or talking catfishes. These fish are native to South America, primarily the Amazon basin and the Guianas.

Doradids are omnivorous.

Taxonomy
As of 2007, 31 genera and 78 species are in this family. Wertheimeria is considered to be the sister taxon to all other doradids. This family is monophyletic and contains the subfamilies Doradinae, Astrodoradinae and Wertheimerinae.

The Astrodoradinae contain the genera Amblydoras, Anadoras, Astrodoras, Hypodoras, Merodoras, Physopyxis, and Scorpiodoras.

Distribution
Doradids occur in most South American basins, though they are absent from the Pacific Coast drainages and from coastal drainages south of the Río de la Plata. About 70% of the valid species occur in the Amazon basin; the Orinoco basin harbors about 22 species and ranks second in species richness. Conversely, only two species of doradids have been described from Brazilian eastern coastal basins: Wertheimeria maculata from the Jequitinhonha and Pardo rivers and Kalyptodoras bahiensis from the Paraguaçu River.

Appearance and anatomy
Doradids are easily recognized by a well-developed nuchal shield in front of the dorsal fin, as well as well-developed bony lumps along the lateral line that form thorny scutes. Also, doradids typically have three pairs of barbels (no nasal barbels), an adipose fin, and four to six rays on the dorsal fin with a spine on the anterior (first) ray. These fish are sometimes called "talking catfish" because of their ability to produce sound by moving their pectoral spine or vibrating their swim bladder.

See also
List of fish families

References

External links
 The Family Doradidae or "Talking Catfishes" Article on Scotcat.com by Chris Ralph

 
Fish of South America
Catfish families
Taxa named by Pieter Bleeker